Billy Burns  (born 20 November 1998) is an Australian professional rugby league footballer who plays as a  forward for the St. George Illawarra Dragons in the NRL.

He previously played for the Penrith Panthers in the National Rugby League.

Background
Burns was born in Parkes, New South Wales, Australia. He played his junior rugby league for Parkes Spacemen. Burns was educated at Red Bend Catholic College, Forbes and at  McCarthy Catholic College, Emu Plains and represented the 2016 Australian Schoolboys. He then signed with Penrith Panthers.

Playing career
Burns made his NRL debut for Penrith against the Sydney Roosters in round 24 of the 2019 NRL season at the Sydney Cricket Ground.

In round 25 2019 against Newcastle, Burns scored 2 tries as Penrith won the match 54–10 at Penrith Park.  Penrith ended the season finishing a disappointing 10th place and missed out on the finals.

On 7 April 2021, it was announced that Burns had signed with St. George Illawarra in a player swap with Eddie Blacker who had signed with Penrith.

Burns played a total of 15 matches for St. George Illawarra in the 2021 NRL season as the club finished 11th on the table and missed out on the finals.

Statistics

References

External links
Penrith Panthers profile

1998 births
Living people
Australian rugby league players
Rugby league players from New South Wales
Rugby league second-rows
Penrith Panthers players
St. George Illawarra Dragons players